Formula Renault is a class of formula racing that was founded in 1971. It is currently the biggest single-seater championship in the United Kingdom.

Season calendar
This table indicates the season calendar. It shows the round number of each series along with their dates. The dark boxes indicates the winter series.

Formula Renault 3.5L
See also 2008 World Series by Renault season and 2008 Formula V6 Asia season

Collective test for notable 2.0L drivers
Every year, Renault Sport Technologies would invite the best Formula Renault 2.0L and Eurocup Mégane Trophy drivers to test the Formula Renault 3.5L. For the 2008 season, the test occurred on November 5–7 on the Paul Ricard HTTT track in France.

Formula Renault 2.0L

Formula Renault 2.0 Eurocup series
See also 2008 Eurocup Formula Renault 2.0 season

Formula Renault 2.0 West European Cup season
The Formula Renault 2.0 West European Cup was the first season for the WEC series. It includes the French Formula Renault championship that offers a reward for the best French driver and rookie driver. It also has the Challenger Cup which is for drivers using cars that run with the 2004 aerodynamic kit.

1 point is given to every pole position holder. 1 point is also given to the fastest driver in each lap.
There are 2 race rounds. The second race is between 20 to 30 minutes.

In Round 6 of the Valencia race, Daniel Ricciardo, Andrea Caldarelli and Jean-Éric Vergne were disqualified for technical regulation non-conformity in their SG Formula's rear wings. Benjamin Lariche, who came in 3rd, was declared the race winner instead.

Formula Renault 2.0 UK season
See also 2008 Formula Renault UK season

Formula Renault 2.0 UK Winter Cup
The Formula Renault UK Winter Cup and Formula Renault BARC Winter Cup are held in same time, but with separated classification.

Formula Renault BARC FR2000 series
The Formula Renault BARC FR2000 series has 12 rounds in 7 venues. The final standing is established with the best 10 results of the season. A Club Class classification is also established for young drivers (see 2008 Formula Renault BARC Club Class season below) who participate in the same race as the FR2000 series.

1 point is given to every pole position holder. 1 point is also given to the fastest driver in each lap.

Formula Renault BARC Club Class series
The Formula Renault BARC Club Class series includes 12 rounds in 7 venues. The final standings are established with the best 11 results of the season. The Club Class category is raced at same time as the main Formula Renault BARC FR2000 series. The cars use Tatuus or Mygale chassis and are powered by Renault Laguna 2.0L 6 valves engine providing lower Horsepower than the FR2000 class.

1 point is given to every pole position holder. 1 point is also given to the fastest driver in each lap.

Formula Renault BARC Winter Cup
See also 2008 Formula Renault 2.0 UK Winter Cup and 2008 Formula Renault BARC Winter Cup.

Formula Renault 2.0 Italia season
See also 2008 Formula Renault 2.0 Italia season

 There are 2 races with rounds length of 30 minutes each. 2 points are awarded to the fastest driver in each lap and another 2 points to the pole position holder.

There are 3 collective tests in summer. In the Misano World Circuit on June 17, in Autodromo Nazionale Monza on July 10 and in the Mugello Circuit on July 23.

Formula Renault 2.0 Italia Winter Series
See also 2008 Formula Renault 2.0 Italia Winter Series

2 points are awarded to the fastest driver in each lap and 4 points to the pole position holder.

Formula Renault 2.0 Northern European Cup season

LO Formule Renault 2.0 Suisse season
See also LO Formule Renault 2.0

Extra 1 point is given to the fastest driver in each lap 2 points to the pole position holder. There are 2 races by rounds.

Fórmula Júnior FR2.0 Portugal season
This is the first season of the Fórmula Júnior FR2.0 held in Portugal. The series, which is the first single-seater championship in Portugal since the end of Formula BMW in 2004, uses Tatuus Formula Renault chassis with Renault 2.0L engines and Michelin tyres.

1 point is given to the fastest driver for each lap and another point to the pole position holder. There are 2 races per round.

The Estoril rounds held on September, 27–28 were part of the World Series by Renault event. The races at the last two venues, in Jerez and Estoril, were held at the same time as the Portugal Winter Series FR2.0.

Fórmula Júnior FR2.0 Portugal(Portugal Winter Series FR2.0)
The Winter Series is held at the same time as the two final venues of the Fórmula Júnior FR2.0 Portugal season.

Every driver who finishes to race will get 1 point. 1 point is also given for the fastest driver in each lap and another point for pole position.

Formule Renault 2.0 Finland season
See also Formule Renault 2.0 Finland

There are 2 or 3 races by rounds, each lasting for approximately 20 minutes.

Formula Renault 2000 de America season
See also Formula Renault 2000 de America

The series is included in the Panam GP Series.

Extra 1 point is given to the fastest driver of each lap and another point for pole position.

The Formula Renault 2000 and 1600 Junior championship were cancelled in May 2008 by Alfonso Toledano, the president of the Panam GP Series. A part of the engaged teams withdrew their participation, forcing the cancellation of the races at the Latin American venues due to low crowd-turnout.

The original calendar was :
Rounds 1&2: Mexico, Autódromo Hermanos Rodríguez, March 15–16
Round 3: Guatemala, Autódromo Los Volcanes, May 11
Round 4: El Salvador, ?, May 18
Round 5: Costa Rica, Autódromo La Guácima, June 8
Rounds 6&7: Ecuador, Autodromo Internacional de Yahuarcocha, August 2–3
Rounds 8&9: Colombia, Autódromo Tocancipá, September 6–7
Round 10: Argentina, ?, October 26
Round 11: Puerto Rico, Ponce International Speedway Park, November 23
Round 12: Republica Dominicana, ?, November 30

Fórmula Renault 2.0 Brasil season

Extra 1 point is given to the fastest driver in each lap and another point for pole position.

The Fórmula Renault 2.0 Brasil championship was cancelled after the first round due to a lack of participation.

Asian Formula Renault Challenge season
See also Asian Formula Renault Challenge

There are 2 races by rounds.

Drivers who start their season at round 5 or later do not receive any points for the final standing. The team points-attribution is different from the driver point system : 10, 8, 6, 5, 4, 3, 2, 1.

The Asian Challenge Category (A) is only for Asian drivers. The China Formula Renault Challenge (C) is for any rounds held in China. The IFC Trophy (IFC) is for the rookie drivers.

Formula Renault 1.6L

Formul'Academy Euro Series season
See also 2008 Formul'Academy Euro Series season and Formul'Academy Euro Series

Formula Renault Elf 1.6 Argentina season
All cars use Tito 02 chassis.

1 point is given for pole position and an extra point in each race for every participating driver.

Other Formulas powered by Renault championships
Unofficial and/or Renault engine supplier formulas series.

GP2 Series seasons
See also GP2 Series, 2008 GP2 Series season, 2008 GP2 Asia Series season, and 2008-09 GP2 Asia Series season

The GP2 Series and GP2 Asia Series are powered by 4 liters, V8 Renault engine and Bridgestone tyres with a Dallara chassis.

Formula 16 season
The official Formula Renault 1.6L Belgium was cancelled after the 2007 season and the Belge Formula 16 attempt to replace it with the same cars. The series was cancelled after 4 races.

Austria Formel Renault Cup season
This is the second season of this series using Formula Renault 2.0L. The season is held on 12 rounds in 6 venues in Czech Republic, Germany and Austria.

1. Autodrom Most (May 17)
2. EuroSpeedway Lausitz (June 29)
3. Hockenheimring (August 3)
4. Most (August 24)
5. Salzburgring (September 28)
6. Hockenheimring (October 19)

Formula Renault 2.0 North European Zone season

1 point is awarded to the fastest driver in each lap and another point for pole position.

Formula 2000 Light season
This is the first season of the Formula 2000 Light held in Italy. The series uses the Tatuus Formula Renault or Formula 3 chassis with Renault 2000 cc maximum engines and Michelin tyres.

2 points are given to the fastest driver in each lap and 3 points for pole position. There are 2 races by rounds.

The championship have several categories :
Over 35 : for drivers above 35 years (+).
Under 17 : for drivers under 17 years (-).
Formula 3 : for drivers using Formula 3 chassis (F3).

Formula 2000 Light Winter Series

3 points for pole position and 2 points for the fastest driver in each lap.

LATAM Challenge Series season
This is the first season of the Latin American (LATAM) Challenge Series held in Mexico. The series uses Tatuus Formula Renault 2.0L F4RS engines and Khumo tyres.

There are 2 races by venue.

Fórmula Renault Plus season
The series is held in the same rounds as its secondary series, Fórmula Renault Interprovencial.

1 point is given for pole position and all drivers receive a point for taking part in the qualifying session.

The calendar includes 12 rounds:
1. Marcos Juárez Motor Club Circuit (February 24)
2. Autódromo Ciudad De Río Cuarto (March 16)
3. Marcos Juárez Motor Club Circuit (April 20)
4. Autódromo Oscar Cabalén (May 11)
5. Marcos Juárez Motor Club Circuit (July 13)
6. Autódromo San Jorge (August 3)
7. Autódromo Oscar Cabalén (August 24)
8. Autódromo Ciudad De Río Cuarto (September 14)
9. Autódromo Oscar Cabalén (October 5)
10. Autódromo San Jorge (October 19)
11. Autódromo Ciudad De Río Cuarto (November 9)
12. Autódromo Oscar Cabalén (November 30)

Fórmula Renault Interprovencial season

The series is held in the same rounds as its main series, Fórmula Renault Plus.

1 point is given for pole position and all drivers receive a point for taking part in the qualifying session.

Fórmula 4 Metropolitana season
This is the first season of the Fórmula 4 Metropolitana series held in Argentina. Cars use the Renault Clio K4M engine (1598cc) with low power. Different from the former Fórmula 4 Nacional series held in 2007, teams can choose their chassis manufacturer; Crespi, Tulia, Tito, etc.

The calendar includes 11 rounds in 3 venues:
1. (April 13) Autódromo Roberto Mouras
2. (May 4) Autódromo Sudamericano de Olavarría
3. (June 8) Autódromo Roberto Mouras
4. (June 29) Autódromo 9 de Julio
5. (July 20) Autódromo Roberto Mouras
6. (August 10) Autódromo Sudamericano de Olavarría
7. (August 31) Autódromo Roberto Mouras
8. (September 21) Autódromo 9 de Julio
9. (October 19) Autódromo Roberto Mouras
10. (November 09) Autódromo Roberto Mouras
11. (November 30) Autódromo Roberto Mouras

Formula Asia 2.0 season
The 2008 season is the first season for the Formula Asia 2.0 series. The series offers a prize for the best Asian driver in the Asian Drivers Cup.Only the two best-placed drivers in each team at each race will receive points for the team championship.''

Rounds 10 and 11 in Shanghai on November 22–23 don't count towards the championship as there was insufficient preparation time due to the delay in the release of the containers by the local customs.

Notes

References

External links
FormulaRenault-Online.com 2008 standings

Renault
Formula Renault seasons